Adnan Mohammad Hassb  is an Iraqi football midfielder who played for the Iraq in the 2000 Asian Cup.

References

External links
 

Iraqi footballers
Iraq international footballers
2000 AFC Asian Cup players
Living people
Association football midfielders
Year of birth missing (living people)